Sar Asiab-e Pain (also Romanized as Sar Āsīāb-e Pā’īn; also known as Asīāb-e Mīān Dasht, Sar Asīāb, Sar Āsīāb, and Sar Āsyab) is a village in Derakhtengan Rural District, in the Central District of Kerman County, Kerman Province, Iran. At the 2006 census, its population was 27, in 7 families.

References 

Populated places in Kerman County